The 1956 Formula One season was the tenth season of FIA's Formula One motor racing. It featured the seventh World Championship of Drivers, and numerous non-championship races. The championship series commenced on 22 January 1956 and ended on 2 September after eight races. Juan Manuel Fangio won his third consecutive title, the fourth of his career. Until the  season, this was the last season during which no British constructor won any championship race.

Season summary
Fangio joined Ferrari after Mercedes-Benz, with whom he had won the 1954 and 1955 titles, withdrew from the sport. Ferrari acquired the folded Lancia team's D50 cars and put together a strong team containing Fangio, Eugenio Castellotti, Luigi Musso and Peter Collins. Fangio won the opening race after commandeering Musso's car after his own broke down. Collins and Fangio's teammate at Mercedes, Stirling Moss – now driving for Maserati provided the biggest challenge to his title defence, each winning two races. In an open season, the British Connaughts, Vanwalls and BRMs also showed some signs of promise.

Going into the final race of the season, Fangio had an eight-point lead over Collins and the consistent Jean Behra, driving for Maserati. The only way he could lose the title would be to score no points, with Collins winning and setting the fastest lap. (Because a driver could only count their best five scores, Behra could not win the title.) Fangio retired, and with Musso unwilling to share his car with Fangio, Collins had a great chance of winning his first title. In a remarkable act of sportsmanship, Collins instead chose to hand his car over to Fangio to allow the Argentine to finish second in the race and win his third title in a row.

Season review
The following races counted towards the 1956 World Championship of Drivers:  

The Suez crisis loomed over the 1956 Formula One season. The Dutch and Spanish Grands Prix were affected by this crisis, and the oil prices were too high for the teams and drivers, so the two races that were originally supposed to be held at Zandvoort and Pedralbes were cancelled. The Indianapolis 500 was USAC-sanctioned so not run to Formula One specifications, and also counted towards the 1956 USAC Championship title.

Teams and drivers

The following teams and drivers competed in the 1956 FIA World Championship.

The above list does not include competitors in the 1956 Indianapolis 500.

World Championship of Drivers standings

Championship points were awarded at each race on an 8–6–4–3–2 basis to the first five finishers, with an additional point awarded to the driver setting the fastest lap of the race. Points for shared drives were divided equally between the drivers, regardless of who had driven more laps. Only the best five-round results were counted.

 Italics indicate the fastest lap (One point awarded – point shared equally between drivers sharing fastest lap)
 Bold indicates pole position
 † Position shared between more drivers of the same car
 Only the best five results counted towards the championship. Numbers without parentheses are championship points; numbers in parentheses are total points scored.

Non-championship races
The following non-championship races for Formula One cars were also held in 1956:

Notes and references

External links
 1956 World Championship race results and images at f1-facts.com
 1956 World Championship images at The Cahier Archive

Formula One seasons